Jane Kennedy (born 9 June 1964) is an Australian actress, comedian, radio presenter and television producer, best known for her work with Working Dog Productions, a group of performers responsible for a variety of television and films. She previously was a co-host of KennedyMolloy on Triple M with Mick Molloy.

Career
She met the other members of the group, which over time included Tom Gleisner, Rob Sitch, Santo Cilauro, Tony Martin, Mick Molloy, and Jason Stephens among others, while working on Melbourne commercial radio on the D-Generation Breakfast Show. Kennedy was not originally a member of the group, but was the newsreader assigned to work with them during their timeslot. The team quickly made a game of trying to make her laugh while she read the news. Their frequent success led to Kennedy joining the D-Generation as a full time member and she continued to work with them on the radio show. The group stayed together to later write, direct and produce The Late Show, a comedy sketch show, Frontline, a widely acclaimed spoof of television current affairs in which she played ambitious reporter Brooke Vandenberg, and Funky Squad, a retro styled spoof of 70s police dramas.

Since the mid-1990s, Kennedy has mostly stayed behind the camera as a casting director and producer for various Working Dog productions, including their panel talk show The Panel, and the films The Castle and The Dish.

Kennedy also appeared on the radio program Get This occasionally, and has been a semi-regular panelist on television chat show The Circle.

In 2009, Kennedy released her first cookbook, Fabulous Food Minus the Boombah. In 2010, she released her second cookbook, OMG! I Can Eat That? and has since written two other cookbooks One Dish Two Ways and The Big Book of Fabulous Food.

From 2017 until 2020 she co-hosted Kennedy Molloy, a national drive show on Triple M in 2018 with her long time comedy colleague Mick Molloy. In January 2021, Kennedy resigned from Triple M to devote more time to her family.

Films

Television

Personal life
Kennedy was born in the Melbourne suburb of Camberwell. Kennedy was educated at the Genazzano FCJ College, in Kew, an inner suburb of Melbourne. She and her husband Rob Sitch have five children and are living in Melbourne.

References

External links
 
 

1964 births
Living people
Australian television actresses
Australian film producers
Australian women film producers
Australian radio personalities
Australian women radio presenters
Australian television personalities
Women television personalities
Australian television producers
Australian women television producers
Australian women comedians
Australian film actresses
Actresses from Melbourne
Australian film studio executives
People educated at Genazzano FCJ College
Women casting directors